Mambourin is a rural locality in Victoria, Australia,  south-west of Melbourne's Central Business District, located within the City of Wyndham local government area. Mambourin recorded a population of 315 at the 2021 census.

The proposed suburb is a result of two major house and land projects in the area - Country Garden Australia's Windermere project (4,700 lots) and Frasers Property's Mambourin project (1,200 lots). Based on an average population of 3.1 people per household in the Wyndham LGA in the 2016 census, this will make the suburb's future population in excess of 18,000 persons. This population forecast, when compared to the current population count of 4 from the 2016 census, would result in a predicted growth of roughly 450,000% over the next few years.

Mambourin will be built around a planned new train station on the existing Regional Rail Link, allowing the suburb's residents to commute directly to the Melbourne CBD. In addition, Mambourin will also have local convenience shopping, including a supermarket, up to 50 specialty stores and an entertainment precinct, as well as two public primary schools and one public secondary school.

References

Towns in Victoria (Australia)
Suburbs of the City of Wyndham